Culp House is a historic home located at Union, Union County, South Carolina.  It was built about 1857, and is a two-story,  brick structure, with Georgian and Neo-Classical design details.  The front façade features a two-tiered, five-bay porch with Doric order columns.

Wade Hampton III delivered a speech from the front porch in 1876.

It was added to the National Register of Historic Places in 1975.

References

Houses on the National Register of Historic Places in South Carolina
Georgian architecture in South Carolina
Neoclassical architecture in South Carolina
Houses completed in 1857
Houses in Union County, South Carolina
National Register of Historic Places in Union County, South Carolina
1857 establishments in South Carolina